An Aerico ( or ) is a disease demon from Greek folklore. It is often believed to normally dwell unseen in the air, though it sometimes takes the form of a human. As a disease demon, Aerico are believed to spread disease, such as the plague and malaria.

References

Greek folklore